St Stephen and All Martyrs' Church, Lever Bridge, is in Darcy Lever, Bolton, Greater Manchester, England. It is an active Anglican parish church in the deanery of Walmsley, the archdeaconry of Bolton, and the diocese of Manchester. The church is recorded in the National Heritage List for England as a designated Grade II* listed building, and is the first of three "pot churches" designed by Edmund Sharpe, so-called because they are constructed largely of terracotta.

History

The church was built between 1842 and 1844 to a design by the Lancaster architect Edmund Sharpe. Other than the foundations and the rubble infill of the walls, the entire church was built in terracotta made by the local firm of the Ladyshore Coal and TerraCotta Company, which was owned by Sharpe's brother-in-law, John Fletcher. Many of the fittings that would normally be made from wood, were also in terracotta. There were problems in firing the terracotta resulting in considerable wastage but, despite this, the church cost only £2,600 to build. The church was formally opened on 18 February 1844, and consecrated on 26 June 1845 by John Bird Sumner, the Bishop of Chester. The land for the church was given by the 2nd Earl of Bradford. It provided seating for 471 people. Originally the church had an openwork spire, with crocketed pinnacles, a parapet with open tracery, and traceried windows.  By the 1930s the spire had become unsafe, and it was dismantled in 1937. There had been plans to rebuild it, but the lower part of the tower was dismantled by the local steeplejack Fred Dibnah in 1966. Following the discovery of extensive dry rot in 1989 a programme of repairs, including the removal of the dry rot, has been undertaken.

Architecture

Exterior

Other than the slate roof, all the visible fabric of the church is terracotta, the use of which material has allowed for a high degree of decoration. The plan of the church is cruciform, consisting of a nave with a west porch (the original base of the tower), two wide transepts, a short chancel, and a vestry in the angle between the north transept and chancel. Externally the nave is divided into five bays by buttresses which are surmounted by finials. Each bay contains a two-light window in Decorated style. The transepts and chancel are similarly divided, with four-light Decorated windows at their ends. Along the top runs an openwork parapet.

Interior
Internally the timber hammerbeam roof is carried on terracotta corbels. There is much decoration, with friezes, ball-flowers, foliage, inscriptions, panels, and blind arcades, all in terracotta. Behind the altar, forming a reredos, are niches, and panelling incorporating the words of the Ten Commandments, the Creed, and the Lord's Prayer. Terracotta also forms the pew ends, which are decorated with poppy heads, and the organ case. The original altar, the octagonal diapered font and pulpit were also in terracotta. The stained glass in the east window, and in some of the windows elsewhere in the church, is by Thomas Willement; one of these windows depicts the execution of Charles I. A window in the south transept is by William Wailes and shows the stoning of Saint Stephen; and one of the windows in the north transept was designed by Henry Holiday in 1884.

Context and assessment

Although terracotta was to become a frequently used building material, particularly in the industrial North of England, it was rarely used for churches. The only churches to be built with this material were the three designed by Sharpe, the others being Holy Trinity, Rusholme, and St Paul's, Scotforth. Its use in St Stephen's has been described as "part experiment, part advertisement". Critical reaction at the time it was built varied from the Illustrated London News, who called it a "truly elegant structure", and the Ecclesiologist, who considered its decoration to be "pretense and affected". Today the Buildings of England series states that "the interior is exceptionally pretty", and National Heritage List for England, referring to the terracotta, states it is "a remarkable demonstration of the capabilities of the material".

Churchyard

The churchyard contains the war graves of nine service personnel, five of World War I and four of World War II. The original war grave headstones, together with a Commemorative Stone, have been re-grouped around the base of a war memorial to the dead of both wars.

See also

List of architectural works by Edmund Sharpe
Grade II* listed buildings in Greater Manchester
Listed buildings in Bolton

Notes

References

Buildings and structures in the Metropolitan Borough of Bolton
Church of England church buildings in Greater Manchester
Grade II* listed churches in Greater Manchester
Gothic Revival church buildings in England
Gothic Revival architecture in Greater Manchester
Churches completed in 1844
19th-century Church of England church buildings
Anglican Diocese of Manchester
Edmund Sharpe buildings
Terracotta